Cercopithecine alphaherpesvirus 9 (CeHV-9) is a species of virus in the genus Varicellovirus, subfamily Alphaherpesvirinae, family Herpesviridae, and order Herpesvirales.

Pathology 
Cercopithecine alphaherpesvirus 9 infects primates and shares clinical, pathological, immunological, and virological features with varicella-zoster virus infection of humans. Monkeys that had been inoculated intratracheally with the virus developed diffuse varicella 10 to 12 days later. Monkeys that were caged with each of the intratracheally infected monkeys developed a mild rash two weeks later, hence providing evidence of airborne transmission.

References

External links 
 

Varicelloviruses